The Cloșcoi is a left tributary of the river Medeș in Romania. It flows into the Medeș in Călătani.

References

Rivers of Romania
Rivers of Bihor County